Jorge Enrique Pulido TV was a Colombian programadora that operated between 1979 and May 1990, owned and operated by the journalist Jorge Enrique Pulido. It is one of the few programadoras to disappear outside of a bidding cycle, doing so six months after his assassination at the hands of the Medellín Cartel in late 1989.

History
The company was awarded one hour a week of programming in 1979 — a paltry amount for a programadora to receive. The programs he aired were of the current affairs/public interest variety, including shows such as Canal Abierto, Las Investigadores and the news program Noticiero Mundovisión, which he hosted at the time of his death and an edition of which he had just finished producing at the Inravisión studios in Bogotá when, leaving the studios, he was killed. The company also presented two kids' programs and two entertainment programs.

References

Television production companies of Colombia
Mass media companies established in 1979
1990 disestablishments in Colombia
1979 establishments in Colombia
Mass media companies disestablished in 1990